Jangsaengpo Whale Museum is a history museum located in Jangsaengpo, Nam-gu, Ulsan, South Korea. It is the only whale museum in South Korea. The museum details Ulsan's history of whaling. Whaling was banned in South Korea in 1986, but whaling artifacts were kept and are now on display in the museum which is built in what was once a central whaling area.

See also 
 List of museums in South Korea
 List of South Korean tourist attractions
 South Korea portal
 Ulsan Museum
 Ulsan Science Museum

References

External links 
 Official website 

Museums in South Korea
Nam District, Ulsan
Museums in Ulsan
Whaling museums